Komuro (written: 小室) is a Japanese surname. Notable people with the surname include:

Daichi Komuro (born 1988), Japanese handball player
, Japanese singer
, Japanese judoka
, Japanese skeleton racer
, Japanese painter
, Japanese musician
, Japanese AV idol, actress and writer

See also
Komuro Station, a railway station in Funabashi, Chiba Prefecture, Japan
 Komuro Castle (小室城), formerly in Ōmi Province, present Nagahama, Shiga

Japanese-language surnames